Leon Strgar (born March 17, 2000, in Brežice, Slovenia) is a Slovenian professional basketball player for Krka of the Slovenian League. He is a 1.93 m tall shooting guard.

Professional career
Stavrov started playing professional basketball for Krško.

In August 2018, Strgar signed a contract with the Krka.

References

External links
 Eurobasket.com profile
 REALGM profile
 PROBALLERS profile

2000 births
Living people
KK Krka players
Slovenian men's basketball players
Shooting guards
ABA League players
People from Brežice